A by-election was held for the New South Wales Legislative Assembly electorate of Sydney-Phillip on 9 June 1900 because of the resignation of Henry Copeland who had accepted the position of Agent-General in London. Daniel O'Connor was previously a  member for West Sydney but had joined the Protectionist party for the 1898 Sydney-Pyrmont election.

Dates

Result

Henry Copeland was appointed Agent-General in London.

See also
Electoral results for the district of Sydney-Phillip
List of New South Wales state by-elections

References

1900 elections in Australia
New South Wales state by-elections
1900s in New South Wales